Simmesport is a town in Avoyelles Parish, Louisiana, United States. The population was 2,161 at the 2010 census. It is the northernmost town on the Atchafalaya River, located near the Old River which connects the Red and Atchafalaya rivers with the Mississippi River.

History 
The town was founded by Bennet Barton Simmes (1811–1888), one-time owner of White Hall Plantation, which was located on the opposite bank of the Atchafalaya River.

Simmes' home was used as the military headquarters for the Union's Red River Campaign (1864) during the American Civil War. General Nathaniel P. Banks was superseded in command by E.R.S. Canby. General Ulysses S. Grant had sought Banks' removal for months, but President Lincoln would not dismiss Banks, who had strong political support in Congress. On May 18, 1864, Canby assumed command in Simmesport, but Banks retained the nominal title of commander of the Department of the Gulf. Historian John D. Winters in The Civil War in Louisiana writes that the failure of the Union's Red River Campaign "could largely be laid at Banks' door, but there were many who shared in this failure."

In December 2005 industrialist Frank Stronach founded a new community just south of Simmesport known as Canadaville, a place intended to house people displaced by Hurricane Katrina.

Geography
Simmesport is located in eastern Avoyelles Parish on the west bank of the Atchafalaya River.

Demographics

2020 census

As of the 2020 United States census, there were 1,468 people, 627 households, and 379 families residing in the town.

2000 census
As of the census of 2000, there were 2,239 people, 751 households, and 510 families residing in the town. The racial makeup of the town was 52.1% White, 46.7% African American, 0.2% American Indian, 0.2% Asian, 0.2% from other races, and 0.6% from two or more races. Hispanic of any race were 0.8% of the population.

There were 751 households, out of which 37.7% had children under the age of 18 living with them, 40.1% were married couples living together, 23.2% had a female householder with no husband present, and 32.0% were non-families. 29.3% of all households were made up of individuals, and 13.0% had someone living alone who was 65 years of age or older. The average household size was 2.58 and the average family size was 3.18.

In the town, the population was spread out, with 27.9% under the age of 18, 10.0% from 18 to 24, 30.1% from 25 to 44, 17.7% from 45 to 64, and 14.2% who were 65 years of age or older. The median age was 34 years. For every 100 females, there were 70.5 males. For every 100 females age 18 and over, there were 59.4 males.

The median income for a household in the town was $15,455, and the median income for a family was $19,115. Males had a median income of $22,153 versus $15,938 for females. The per capita income for the town was $8,061. About 33.0% of families and 35.8% of the population were below the poverty line, including 41.5% of those under age 18 and 28.6% of those age 65 or over.

The cusp of tributaries and distributaries
Simmesport sits very near the end of the Red River and the beginning of the Atchafalaya River, into which water from the Mississippi once flowed freely. In the 1960s, the Old River Control Structure was constructed on the Mississippi to regulate the division of flow between the two. Some advocates for wetland renewal recommend increasing the flow of water into the Atchafalaya basin in the interest of replenishing land lost to coastal subsidence.

Notable people
 Norma McCorvey, a.k.a. "Jane Roe", the plaintiff in Roe v. Wade, was born in Simmesport in 1947.
 Joe Simon, the soul musician, was born in Simmesport in 1943.

References

External links
 Don't sneeze at Atchafalaya policy changes, LaCoastPost.com, July 6, 2009

Towns in Louisiana
Towns in Avoyelles Parish, Louisiana